Richard Wayne was a mayor of Savannah, Georgia.

Richard Wayne may also refer to:

Richard Wayne, Afterwards (1928 film)

See also

Richard Wain, Welsh VC recipient
Rick Wayne, pop singer